Daniele Tessari (born 20 August 1984) is an Italian motorcycle speedway rider who rode in Speedway Grand Prix of Italy.

Career details

World Championships 
 Individual World Championship and Speedway Grand Prix
 2005 - 31st place (0 pts in one event)
 2006 - 31st place (0 pts in one event)
 2007 - 34th place (0 pts in one event)
 Team World Championship (Speedway World Team Cup and Speedway World Cup)
 2003 - 12th place
 2004 - 7th place

European Championships 
 Individual European Championship
 2005 -  Lonigo - 15th place (2 pts)
 European Pairs Championship
 2004 - 6th place in Semi-Final 1
 2006 - 6th place in Semi-Final 2

See also 
 Italy national speedway team
 List of Speedway Grand Prix riders

References 

1984 births
Italian speedway riders
Living people